Badru Hafidh is a Tanzanian professional football manager. Until 1998 and from September 2003 to July 2006 he coached the Tanzania national football team.

References

External links

Year of birth missing (living people)
Living people
Tanzanian football managers
Tanzania national football team managers
Place of birth missing (living people)